The European Union Science Olympiad (EUSO) is a team-based science competition for the European Union's (EU) students to display their capabilities in natural sciences. The annual EUSO was founded in 2003 by Dr. Michael A. Cotter, Dublin Ireland includes only EU member countries. The competition is open to second-level-school, or secondary school, science students who are 16 years of age or younger prior to the competition. Each participating country sends two three-student teams who compete in two intellectually challenging and collaborative tasks. The tasks are designed to connect the branches of science, provide relevant and inquiry-based challenges, engage all team members, support self-pacing, prompt higher-order and creative thinking, and encourage substantive communication.

History

The EUSO was founded in 2003 by Dr. Michael A. Cotter, of Dublin, Ireland, who aimed to create a more practical-based general science competition for young EU students.

EUSO 2003 
The first EUSO was held in Dublin, Ireland, on 6–13 April 2003. The Director was Dr. Michael A. Cotter. Seven countries attended: Belgium, Germany, Ireland, the Netherlands, the United Kingdom, Spain, and Sweden. Switzerland sent an observer. The opening and closing ceremonies took place in the Mansion House attended by Minister Noel Treacy TD; Minister Mary Hanafin TD; the Dublin Lord Mayor, Councillor Dermot Lacey; the deputy Lord Mayor; Senator Liam Fitzgerald; and Professor Malcolm Smyth, Dean of the Faculty of Science & Health at Dublin City University (DCU).

The EUSO 2003 Management Committee included:
Chairperson: Dr. Carl Ó Dálaigh
Director: Dr. Michael A. Cotter
Administrator: Ms. Sonya Mc Kenna
Scientific Committee: Prof. Richard O'Kennedy, Dr. Paraic James, Dr. Paul van Kampen, Dr. George Porter
Senior Examiners: Dr. Ciarán Fagan, Dr. Wesley Browne, Dr. Enda McGlynn

The two experiments were held in the Science laboratories at DCU under the supervision of Mr. Maurice Burke, MSc.

Medals were awarded to the following teams:

At the GB meeting, attended by all seven country coordinators, the 2003 edition of the Constitution was agreed. The main changes included the reduction of the student participants’ age to "sixteen on the previous December 31st" and the amalgamation of the role of country coordinator with one of the country mentors.

EUSO 2004 
Fifteen EU countries participated in the second EUSO in Groningen, the Netherlands, on 2–8 May 2004. The Director was Drs. Hans Jordens. The host country invited the seven countries that participated in the first EUSO in Dublin in April 2003. They were represented by a total of 19 teams (57 Students): Belgium (2 teams), Germany (3 teams), Ireland (3 teams), Netherlands (3 teams), Spain (3 teams), Sweden (3 teams) and the United Kingdom (2 teams). Each country also sent mentors for Biology, Chemistry and Physics.

Medals were awarded as follows:
Gold medal and EUSO Trophy: Germany (Team B).
Gold medal: Germany (Team C).
Silver Medals: Sweden (Team C), Netherlands (Team C), Germany (Team A), Ireland (Team A), Belgium (Team A), United Kingdom (Team A) and Ireland (Team C).
Bronze Medals (in alphabetical order): Belgium (Team B), Ireland (Team B), Netherlands (Team A), Netherlands (Team B), Spain (Team A), Spain (Team B), Spain (Team C), Sweden (Team A), Sweden (Team B) and the United Kingdom (Team B).

Scientific Observers represented eight countries that joined the EU in 2004. These countries were Cyprus, Czech Republic, Estonia, Greece, Latvia, Malta, Poland and Slovakia. These countries, and the seven countries listed above, were invited to send a full delegation to the EUSO 2005.

EUSO 2005 
The third EUSO was held in Galway, Ireland, on 14–21 May 2005. The Directors were Dr. Michael A. Cotter & Mr. Bernard Kirk. The experiments were developed by and held in NUI Galway and GMIT under the supervision of Dr. Paraic James (DCU). The Patron was Mr. Noel Treacy TD, Minister for European Affairs.

A constitutional change (3.2.1) in 2004 reduced the delegations to two teams with three science students in each and a Mentor for each discipline (Biology, Chemistry and Physics), with one acting as the Country Coordinator and one acting as the Head of the Delegation.

Ten countries were represented by a total of 18 teams (54 Students): Belgium (2 teams), Cyprus (2 teams), Estonia (2 teams), Germany (2 teams), Ireland (2 teams), Latvia (1 team), Netherlands (2 teams), Slovakia (1 team), Spain (2 teams) and Sweden (2 teams). Each country also sent three mentors. The United Kingdom sent a Scientific Observer.

Medals were awarded as follows:
Gold Medal & EUSO Trophy: Slovakia (Team A).
Gold Medal: Germany (Team B).
Silver Medals: Estonia (Team A), Germany (Team A), Belgium, (Team A), Spain (Team A), Ireland (Team B), Netherlands (Team B) and Netherlands (Team A).
Bronze Medals (in alphabetical order): Belgium (Team B), Cyprus (Team A), Cyprus (Team B), Estonia (Team B), Ireland (Team A), Latvia (Team A), Spain (Team B), Sweden (Team A) and Sweden (Team B).

EUSO 2006 
The fourth EUSO was held in Brussels, Belgium, on 2–8 April 2006. The Director was Mr. Victor Rasquin. The experiments were developed by and held in Vrije Universiteit van Brussel (VUB) and the Université Libre de Bruxelles (ULB). The Coordinators were Prof. Dr. Luc Leyns and Mrs. Roosje Van Den Driessche and the chairman was Prof. Dr. Louis De Vos. The Patron was Her Majesty, Queen Paola of Belgium.

A delegation of two teams (three students in each) and a mentor for each discipline (Biology, Chemistry and Physics) represented participating countries. One mentor was the Country Coordinator and Head of the Delegation.

Twelve countries were represented by a total of 23 teams (69 Students): Belgium (2 teams), Cyprus (2 teams), Estonia (2 teams), Germany (2 teams), Greece (2 teams), Ireland (2 teams), Latvia (1 team), Netherlands (2 teams), Slovakia (1 team), Spain (2 teams), Sweden (2 teams) and the United Kingdom (2 teams). Each country also sent three mentors. Denmark sent a Scientific Observer.

Medals were awarded as follows:
EUSO Trophy & Gold Medal: Germany (Team A).
Gold Medal: Latvia (Team A) and Netherlands (Team B).
Silver Medals: Germany (Team B), Slovakia (Team A), Ireland (Team B), Estonia (Team A), Netherlands (Team A), Estonia (Team B), Belgium, (Team B), Slovakia (Team B), Spain (Team A) and Ireland (Team A).
Bronze Medals (in alphabetical order): Belgium (Team A), Cyprus (Team A), Cyprus (Team B), Greece (Team A.), Greece (Team B), Spain (Team B), Sweden (Team A), Sweden (Team B), United Kingdom (Team A) and the United Kingdom (Team B).

EUSO 2007 
The fifth EUSO was held in Potsdam, Brandenburg, Germany on 25 March – 1 April 2007. The Director was Dr. Eckhard Lucius; Vice Directors, Dr. Marlen Fritzsche and Mr. Matthias Griessner; Secretary, Ms. Renate Glawe. The experiments were developed by and held at the University of Potsdam. The chairman was Professor Thomas Altmann.

Sixteen EU countries were represented by a total of 29 teams (87 Students). Delegations included one or two teams of three students, and a mentor for each discipline (Biology, Chemistry and Physics). One mentor was the Country Coordinator and Head of the Delegation. Austria and Bulgaria sent Scientific Observers. International guests from Indonesia and Taiwan represented the IJSO.

Teams: Belgium (2 teams), Cyprus (2 teams), Czech Republic (2 teams), Estonia (2 teams), Germany (2 teams), Greece (2 teams), Ireland (2 teams), Latvia (1 team), Lithuania (1 team), Luxembourg (2 teams), Netherlands (2 teams), Slovakia (2 teams), Slovenia (1 team), Spain (2 teams), Sweden (2 teams) and the United Kingdom (2 teams).

Medals were awarded as follows:
EUSO Trophy & Gold Medal: Germany (Team B).
Gold Medals: Germany (Team A), Spain (Team A), Estonia (Team A) and Netherlands (Team A).
Silver Medals: Slovakia (Team A), Lithuania (Team A), Latvia (Team A), Ireland (Team B), Slovakia (Team B), Estonia (Team B), Ireland (Team A), United Kingdom (Team A), Spain (Team B) and Netherlands (Team B).
Bronze Medals (in alphabetical order): (Teams A); Belgium, Cyprus, Czech Republic, Greece, Luxembourg, Slovenia, Sweden, (Teams B); Belgium, Cyprus, Czech Republic, Greece, Luxembourg, Sweden and the United Kingdom.

EUSO 2008 
The sixth EUSO was held in Nicosia, Cyprus, on 11–17 May 2008. The Director was Mr. Mikis Hadjineophytou. The Organising Committee was assisted by the Director of the Ministry of Education and Culture, Mrs Olympia Stylianou. The experiments, carried out by the students at the University of Cyprus, were developed by the Scientific Committee composed of Dr. Epaminondas Leontides, Chemistry Professor at the University of Cyprus, Dr. Christina Sidera, Dr. Constantinos Phanis, Mr. Anaxagoras Hadjiiosif and Mr. Andreas Papastylianou.

Twenty-one EU countries were represented by a total of 33 teams (99 Students). Delegations included one or two teams of three students, and a mentor for each discipline (Biology, Chemistry and Physics). One mentor was the Country Coordinator and Head of the Delegation. Hungary, Portugal and the United Kingdom sent Scientific Observers.

Teams: Austria (2 teams), Belgium (2 teams), Bulgaria (2 teams), Cyprus (2 teams), Czech Republic (2 teams), Denmark (2 teams), Estonia (2 teams), Germany (2 teams), Greece (2 teams), Ireland (2 teams), Latvia (1 team), Lithuania (2 teams), Luxembourg (2 teams), Netherlands (2 teams), Slovakia (2 teams), Slovenia (1 team), Spain (2 teams) and Sweden (2 teams).

Medals were awarded as follows:
EUSO Trophy & Gold Medal: Estonia (Team B).
Gold Medals: Netherlands (Team B), Germany (Team A), Slovakia (Team B), Latvia (Team A), Lithuania (Team B), Ireland (Team B) and Cyprus (Team B).
Silver Medals: Czech Republic (Team A), Lithuania (Team A), Austria (Team A), Czech Republic (Team B), Belgium (Team A), Germany (Team B), Estonia (Team A), Ireland (Team A) and Slovakia (Team A).
Bronze Medals (in alphabetical order): (Teams A): Bulgaria, Cyprus, Greece, Luxembourg, Netherlands, Slovenia, Spain, and Sweden. (Teams B): Austria, Belgium, Bulgaria, Denmark, Greece, Luxembourg, Spain and Sweden.

EUSO 2009 
The seventh EUSO was held in Murcia, Spain from 28 March to 5 April 2009. The Honorary president was His Majesty the King, D. Juan Carlos I of Spain, the Director was Prof. Juan Antonio Rodríguez Renuncio and the Coordinator was Dr. Jorge Molero Fernández. The Organising Committee was chaired by, Ilma. Sra. Dna. Rosa Peñalver Pérez, General Director of Territory Cooperation (Ministry of Educatión), and included, Ilmo. Sr. D. Carlos Romero Gallego, General Director for Educational Promotion and Innovation (Regional Government of Murcia) and, Ilmo. Sr. Dr. D. Francisco Guillermo Díaz Baños, Vice-President of the University of Murcia.

The two experiments were developed by the Scientific Committee based at Murcia University under the direction of Prof. José Antonio Lozano Teruel and the chairmanship of Prof. Manuel Hernández Córdoba. This committee also included Dr. Carmen López Erroz, Professor of Analytical Chemistry, Dr. Gloria Villoria Cano, Professor of Chemical Engineering, Dr. Patricia Lucas Elio, Professor of Genetic and Microbiology, Dr. Antonio Sánchez Amat, Professor of Genetics and Microbiology, Dr. Jorge de Costa Ruiz, Professor of Physiology, Dr. Antonio Guirao Piñera, Professor of Optics, and Dr. Rafael García Molina, Professor of Applied Physics.

Twenty-one EU countries were represented by a total of 40 teams (120 Students). Delegations included one or two teams of three students, and a mentor for each discipline (Biology, Chemistry and Physics). One mentor was the Country Coordinator and Head of the Delegation. Romania and France sent Scientific Observers for the first time.

Teams: Austria (2 teams), Belgium (2 teams), Bulgaria (2 teams), Cyprus (2 teams), Czech Republic (2 teams), Denmark (2 teams), Estonia (2 teams), Germany (2 teams), Greece (2 teams), Hungary (2 teams), Ireland (2 teams), Latvia (1 team), Lithuania (2 teams), Luxembourg (2 teams), Netherlands (2 teams), Portugal (2 teams), Slovakia (2 teams), Slovenia (1 team), Spain (2 teams), Sweden (2 teams) and the United Kingdom (2 teams).

Medals were awarded as follows:
EUSO Trophy & Gold Medal: Czech Republic (Team A). 
Gold Medals: Hungary (Team A), Germany (Team B), Germany (Team A) and Estonia (Team A).
Silver Medals: Netherlands (Team A), Lithuania (Team A), Czech Republic (Team A), Ireland (Team A), Belgium (Team A), Netherlands (Team B), United Kingdom  (Team B), Austria (Team B), Cyprus (Team B), Lithuania (Team B), Slovakia (Team B) and Greece (Team B).
Bronze Medals (in alphabetical order): (Teams A): Bulgaria, Cyprus, Denmark, Greece, Latvia, Luxembourg, Portugal, Slovakia, Slovenia, Spain, Sweden and the United Kingdom
(Teams B): Austria, Belgium, Bulgaria, Denmark, Estonia, Hungary, Ireland, Luxembourg, Portugal, Spain and Sweden.

Host countries

EUSO participating countries

External links
 Official website

References

Science
European Union and science and technology
Science competitions
Youth science